Iddinshall is a former civil parish, now in the parish of Clotton Hoofield, in the Cheshire West and Chester district and ceremonial county of Cheshire in England. In 2001 it had a population of 42. The civil parish was abolished in 2015 and merged into Clotton Hoofield.

The parish contained one listed building, Iddinshall Hall, which is recorded in the National Heritage List for England as a designated Grade II listed building. This is a brick farmhouse dating from the 18th century. To the southeast of the building is a moated site, formerly occupied by a building also known as Iddenshall Hall, which had been demolished by 1810. The site is a scheduled monument.

References

External links

Former civil parishes in Cheshire
Cheshire West and Chester